Elijah Lidonde is a Kenyan former footballer. He was capped 26 times for the Kenya national football team between 1950 and 1961, scoring 33 goals.

Career statistics

International

International goals
Scores and results list Kenya's goal tally first.

References

Date of birth unknown
Date of death unknown
Kenyan footballers
Kenya international footballers
Association football forwards